The seventh season of Dancing with the Stars was the last to be hosted by Daryl Somers. It was also the last season to be aired on a Tuesday night and have a panel consisting of four judges, until season 13.

This season commenced on 25 September 2007 and concluded on 27 November 2007.

Bridie Carter and her professional partner Craig Monley were named the eventual winners, defeating Anh Do and his partner.

The season featured the following celebrities.

Couples

Scoring Chart
Red numbers indicate the couples with the lowest score for each week.
Green numbers indicate the couples with the highest score for each week.
 indicates the couple (or couples) eliminated that week.
 indicates the returning couple that finished in the bottom two.
 indicates the couple that would have been eliminated had an elimination taken place.
 indicates the winning couple.
 indicates the runner-up couple.
 indicates the third-place couple.

Dance Schedule
The celebrities and professional partners danced one of these routines for each corresponding week.

Week 1 : Cha-Cha-Cha or Quickstep
Week 2 : Jive or Tango
Week 3 : Salsa or Foxtrot
Week 4 : Waltz or Paso Doble
Week 5 : Samba or Rumba
Week 6 : One unlearned dance (Week 1 to Week 5) and a Group Bollywood Routine.
Week 7 : One unlearned dance (Week 1 to Week 5)
Week 8 : One unlearned dance (Week 1 to Week 5) and a Disco Routine.
Week 9 : One unlearned dance (Week 1 to Week 5) and an Argentine Tango
Week 10 : Final unlearned dance, Favourite dance of the season & Freestyle

Highest And Lowest Scoring Performances 
The best and worst performances in each dance according to the judges' marks are as follows:

Couples' highest and lowest scoring dances
Scores are based upon a 40-point maximum:

Dance Chart

 Highest Scoring Dance
 Lowest Scoring Dance

This dance was repeated by the couple at the finale.

Average Chart

The average chart is based on the dances performed by the celebrities and not their place in the competition.

Running Order
Unless indicated otherwise, individual judges scores in the chart below (given in parentheses) are listed in this order from left to right: Todd McKenney, Helen Richey, Paul Mercurio, Mark Wilson.

Week 1 

Running order

Week 2 
Running order

Week 3 
Running order

Week 4 
Running order

Week 5 
Running order

Week 6 
Running order

Week 7 
Running order

Week 8 
Running order

Week 9 
Running order

Week 10 
Running order

References

Season 07
2007 Australian television seasons